Kabwe 1 (also called the Broken Hill skull, Rhodesian Man) is a Middle Paleolithic fossil assigned by Arthur Smith Woodward in 1921 as the type specimen for Homo rhodesiensis, now mostly considered a synonym of  Homo heidelbergensis.

The cranium was discovered in the lead and zinc mine of Broken Hill, Northern Rhodesia (now Kabwe, Zambia) on 17 June 1921 by Tom Zwiglaar, a Swiss miner, and an African miner whose name was not recorded. 
In addition to the cranium, an upper jaw from another individual, a sacrum, a tibia, and two femur fragments were also found. The skull was dubbed "Rhodesian Man" at the time of the find, but is now commonly referred to as the Broken Hill skull or the Kabwe cranium.

The skull is kept in the Natural History Museum, London.

Discovery
Details of the skull's recovery were recorded by Aleš Hrdlička, an anthropologist with the Smithsonian Institution. Swiss miner Tom Swiglaar and an unnamed African miner uncovered the skull on June 17, 1921 while working an ore pocket within the mine. The skull was shown to the mine's managers, who photographed it being held by Swiglaar. It was then examined by a doctor at Broken Hill, who recognized it as a fossil of potential scientific importance. Several months later, the Rhodesia Broken Hill Mine Company shipped it to England, donating it to the British Museum in London. There it was examined by paleontologist Arthur Smith Woodward and identified as belonging to a new species, then identified as Homo rhodesiensis.

Date
The destruction of the paleoanthropological site has made stratigraphic dating impossible. Prior to the 1970s, the skull was believed to be only 30-40,000 years old. In 1974, Bada et al. (1974) established a direct date of 110 ka, measured by aspartic acid racemisation. The Smithsonian Institution suggested in 2010 an age between 150,000 and 300,000 years old, with an upper bound of 500,000 years suggested by animal fossils collected from the site.
A new technique applied to the skull allowed quarter millimetre thick fragments to be removed and the skull therefore dated directly, with the new estimated age range, published in 2020, being 324,000 to 274,000 years ago.

Morphology

Cranial capacity of the Broken Hill skull has been estimated at 1,230 cm³. The  skull suggests an extremely robust individual with the comparatively largest brow-ridges of any known hominin. It was described as having a broad face similar to that of  Homo neanderthalensis (i.e. large nasal bones and thick protruding brow ridges).

The skull has cavities in ten of the upper teeth and is considered one of the oldest known occurrences of cavities.  Pitting indicates significant infection before death and implies that the cause of death may have been due to dental disease infection or possibly chronic ear infection.

Classification
Initially, the skull was classified as belonging to a novel species, Homo rhodesiensis, which is now generally classified as a synonym for African subspecies of  Homo heidelbergensis. While the cranial volume overlaps with the range of Homo sapiens, other features such as the brain case morphology and prominent brow ridges are suggestive of older species. These features have led some scientists to the conclusion that Homo heidelbergensis represents a transitional phase between the earlier Homo erectus and modern humans and Neanderthals. As of 2019, no attempts to extract DNA or sequence a genome from the Kabwe skull have been successful. Results of radiometric dating of matrix associated with Kabwe 1 place the age estimate of Kabwe 1 at 299,000 years old, virtually about the same age as the earliest Homo sapiens. In October of 2021, it was suggested the skull was a late surviving representative of the newly defined species, Homo bodoensis.

Possible repatriation
Since the 1970s, the government of Zambia has petitioned the United Kingdom for custody of the Kabwe skull, citing a number of international laws and treaties on cultural artifacts as well as colonial-era laws made by the United Kingdom. According to the interpretation of the 1912 Bushman Relics Proclamation offered by the Zambian government, it was unlawful in 1921 to remove cultural relics from Northern Rhodesia without a permit from the British South Africa Company, which it maintains was not issued to the Broken Hill mining company prior to its donation of the skull to the British Museum. In May 2018, at a meeting of the UNESCO World Heritage Committee, British delegates agreed to negotiations with Zambia regarding eventual repatriation of the artifact, accompanied by agreements regarding access to the skull and associated scans and digital data by researchers.

See also
Bodo cranium

References

Homo heidelbergensis fossils
1921 archaeological discoveries